Park Kyung-hoon (Hangul: 박경훈; born 12 January 1998) is a South Korean male badminton player. In 2017, he helped the Korean national team compete at the 2017 Sudirman Cup and won that tournament.

Achievements

BWF World Junior Championships 
Mixed doubles

BWF International Challenge/Series (1 title, 1 runner-up)
Men's doubles

Mixed Doubles

 BWF International Challenge tournament
 BWF International Series tournament

References

External links 
 

1998 births
Living people
People from Jeonju
South Korean male badminton players
Badminton players at the 2018 Asian Games
Asian Games competitors for South Korea
Sportspeople from North Jeolla Province